This is a list of tallest skyscrapers in Malaysia. The skyscrapers are ranked by structural height.

Most of Malaysia's tallest buildings can be found in the capital city of Kuala Lumpur.

List of cities/towns by number of completed skyscrapers above 100m/40m and the city's/town's tallest building
This is a list of cities/towns by number of completed or topped out skyscrapers as of today. The majority of international organisations, such as the CTBUH define a skyscraper as a building that reaches or exceeds the height of 150 metres and 30 floors, while Emporis defines a skyscraper as a building reaching or exceeding 100 metres and 20 floors.

List of tallest buildings by state / federal territories

Completed

The following is a list of tallest buildings with a height of 150 meters (492 ft) or more in Malaysia. The height of each building listed here is measured up to its spire and architectural details, but antenna masts are excluded, based on standard skyscraper's height measure by Council on Tall Buildings and Urban Habitat (CTBUH). Existing skyscrapers are included for ranking purposes based on their present height. This list includes buildings that are still under construction and have already been topped-out.

Under construction/topped-out

Notes:

 * = CTBUH estimated data, ** = minimum height

On hold/Postponed

Proposed/Vision

Notes:
 * = CTBUH estimated data, ** = minimum height

List of tallest structures

Timeline of tallest buildings
This lists commercial buildings that once held the title of tallest building in Malaysia.

Buildings with this sign (*) indicate that they have been demolished.

See also
 List of tallest buildings in the world
 List of tallest buildings in Kuala Lumpur
 List of tallest buildings in George Town
 List of tallest buildings in Johor Bahru
 List of tallest buildings in Kota Kinabalu

References

External links
SkyscraperPage.com
Emporis.com, general database of skyscrapers

|}

Tallest
Malaysia
 
Malaysia